Thermohalobacter is a Gram-negative, thermophilic, strictly halophilic, non-spore-forming anaerobic, rod-shaped and motile genus of bacteria from the family of Clostridiaceae with one known species (Thermohalobacter berrensis). Thermohalobacter berrensis has been isolated from a solar saltern.

References

Clostridiaceae
Bacteria genera
Monotypic bacteria genera
Taxa described in 2000